"The Blood That Moves the Body" is a song by Norwegian band A-ha, released on 6 June 1988 as the second single from the band's third studio album, Stay on These Roads.

This song was re-released on 30 March 1992 with the remixes by Alan Tarney. The video remained unchanged.

The dark, enigmatic lyrics of this song have been attributed to many things, including teen suicides in Japan and literary references to Eyes of a Blue Dog.

The "Two-Time Gun Remix" was later included on A-ha's 2010 compilation album, 25, which features all of the band's hits, across two CDs.

Music video

The music video was directed by Andy Morahan and filmed in and around Hotel Regina Louvre  in Paris , France. Some adittional scenes were filmed in Vienna.

Track listings
7-inch single: Warner Bros. / W 7840 United Kingdom (1988)
"The Blood That Moves the Body" (Album Version) - 4:06
"There's Never a Forever Thing" - 2:50

12-inch single: Warner Bros. / W 7840 TW United Kingdom (1988)
"The Blood That Moves the Body" (Extended Version) – 5:25
"The Blood That Moves the Body" (Album Version) – 4:06
"There's Never a Forever Thing" – 2:49
 Track 1 is also known as "Extended Remix" or "Extended Mix".
 Also released as a 12" picture disc (W 7840 TP)

CD single: Warner Bros. / W 7840CD United Kingdom (1988)
"The Blood That Moves the Body" – 4:07
"There's Never a Forever Thing" – 2:51
"The Blood That Moves the Body" (Extended Version) – 5:25
"The Living Daylights" (James Bond Version) – 4:11

7-inch single: Warner Bros. / W 0089 United Kingdom (1992)
 "The Blood That Moves the Body" (The Gun Mix)" – 4:15
 "The Blood That Moves the Body"n (Two-Time Gun Mix) – 4:17
 Remixes by Alan Tarney.

12-inch single: Warner Bros. / W 0089T United Kingdom (1992)
 "The Blood That Moves the Body" (The Gun Mix)" – 4:15
 "The Blood That Moves the Body" (Two-Time Gun Mix) – 4:17
 "The Blood That Moves The Body" (The Second Gun Around Mix) - 5:56
 Remixes by Alan Tarney.

CD single: Warner Bros. / W 0089CD United Kingdom (1992)
"The Blood That Moves the Body" (The Gun Mix)" – 4:15
 "The Blood That Moves the Body" (Two-Time Gun Mix) – 4:17
 "The Blood That Moves The Body" (The Second Gun Around Mix) - 5:56
 Remixes by Alan Tarney.

Charts

References

1988 singles
1988 songs
1992 singles
A-ha songs
Music videos directed by Andy Morahan
Song recordings produced by Alan Tarney
Songs about suicide
Songs written by Paul Waaktaar-Savoy
Warner Records singles